Keys Child Care was founded in 1994 by Sheila Fearnley, Barbara Fleetwood and Veronica Reynolds. From its inception, the company provided residential child care within a therapeutic environment. The first home established by the company was located in the Lancashire mill town of Rawtenstall and by 2006 the company employed 150 staff within 10 children's homes. It also owned two residential schools in the north-west of England. In 2006 Keys Child Care was bought by the Belfast based group Annvale for over 1 million Euros.

In 2009 The British Journal of Social Work accepted the article "To Have and to Hold: Questions about a Therapeutic Service for Children" The article was authored by Sudbery, Shardlow and Huntington and described the use of Holding Therapy within the Keys Attachment Centre. A response to this article by Professor Jean Mercer was accepted by the same journal in May 2011. This article questioned the methodology of the original study and raised concerns regarding the safety and efficacy of Holding Therapy in general. 

The Keys Attachment Homes form part of the wider Keys Group. The group has grown significantly in recent years and has acquired a number of companies in the area of child care, education and young peoples services. According to the Keys Group website, these acquisitions included buying the education services provider 7KS out of administration in February 2012.

Notes 

Organisations based in Lancashire
1994 establishments in the United Kingdom
Child welfare